DiCamillo is a surname. Notable people with the surname include:

Brandon DiCamillo (born 1976), American actor, stuntman, and screenwriter
Gary T. DiCamillo (born  1952), American businessman
Kate DiCamillo (born 1964), American writer

See also
 DiCamillo Bakery, Italian American family-run bakery chain founded in 1920